Retford King Edward VI Grammar School was a grammar school opened on London Road, Retford, Nottinghamshire, in 1857, after being moved from an older site in Chapelgate. The school closed down in 2003.

The school motto Ex pulvere palma means (loosely): "out of the dust (of competition) (comes) the palm" (of victory)

History

The school, which was located on London Road site was opened in 1857 with buildings designed by builder Decimus Burton. Consisting of only one schoolroom originally, the school later built a library, head master's house later to house the school office, and head master's office.
 
In 1890, an adjoining gymnasium was added, with above it a large projection room. 1906 meant the erection of, along the Dominie Cross Road, several ‘temporary’ buildings, which included the so-called "Tin Tab".

In 1912, the school pupils, like those of many other schools of the day, donated monies to fund dogs for the 1912 Arctic expedition of Robert Falcon Scott.

The Fives Court was gifted in 1924 in the memory of William Eyre a fallen World War 1 casualty. In 1926 a new block of classrooms was opened containing the first library. The iron guttering still bears that date in 2019.

In 1937, a new Assembly hall was added.

Pre-War

War Time 
Many ex-pupils of the school served in the armed forces during the 1st World War and details of some those can be found in the online Great War Forum.

During the 2nd World War, pupils from Great Yarmouth were relocated to Retford Grammar School

Post War
The Headmaster from 1926 to 1950 was Charles William Pilkington-Rogers (MA BSc FCP), a Cambridge Mathematics graduate, whose teaching career began in 1903 as Science and Mathematics Master at Dunheved College in Launceston, Cornwall.

Squash courts were opened in 1957 and in 1958 a new gymnasium was constructed. In 1958, a new modern (CLASP) science block was added. At the same time, on the opposite side of the playing field, a new single storey art block was also constructed. In 1967 the school received its own astrological observatory, built by local enthusiasts and opened by the astronomer Patrick Moore.

In 1976 a new Sixth Form Block was added at the end of the Hall, and opposite the Cloisters (source Christopher Trend 1970-1977). It featured a spacious common room and kitchen on the ground floor, as well as even a record player!

The (mainly) complete and original class listings 1954-1977 have now been recovered from the Nottingham Inspire archive, and, with the permission and appropriate publishing fees, shared at http://www.oldretfordians.org.uk

In 1979 several more new buildings were added. A new music block was added between the New Block, now becoming known as the Old Block, and the main school building. Also in the same year, a large new multidisciplinary block housing on the ground floor, wood and metal workshops, and upstairs a suite of domestic science kitchens and the Mathematics department.

The Retfordian
For many years, at least between 1913 and the 1950s, events and life at the school were chronicled in the school's own publication, The Retfordian.

A growing number of Retfordian magazines are now published, with the consent and assistance of the Nottinghamshire archives, at http://www.oldretfordians.org.uk

Final Grammar School days
In 1979, after the inclusion of King Edward VI Grammar School and the High School in parliamentary discussion, Retford King Edward VI Grammar School, and Sir Frederick Milner's School were merged into King Edward VI Comprehensive School. At the point of the merger in 1979 with the Frederick Milner School, many of the school records were deposited with the National Archives.

In January 1998, Rosemary Salisbury became one of the final headteachers of what was now known simply as the King Edward VI School and the first woman to do so.

Closure 
In the 21st century, the school was scheduled for closure. It closed in 2003. 

The school was formally replaced by the new Retford Oaks Academy opened in 2003.The school stood empty for a number of years after closure, these pictures from Urbanography showing the last wall displays still in place from its final days.

The pictures at urban exploration site 28 Days Later include a rare 2011 picture of the entrance to the new music rooms internally linking the original school and New Block opened in 1978, and later demolished during redevelopment.

Redevelopment 

The old school buildings were eventually sold for redevelopment circa 2011.

During the demolition of the newer building to the rear of the school in 2012, problems were encountered with the disposal of asbestos contained in them.

The architects for the redevelopment were Rayner Davies.

King Edward VI Grammar School Trust 

The proceeds of the sale of the school site were entrusted to a legal trust, the King Edward VI Grammar School Trust, which endows young people with grants towards their ongoing education.

link to King Edward VI Grammar School Trust

Old Retfordians 
Former pupils may join the "Old Retfordians Association".

External links 
 The Bassetlaw Museum, Amcott House, at 40 Grove Street, Retford has a collection of school artefacts and some early photographs of the school on its own website.
 www.eyemead.com/open.htm is a private archive of King Edward VI Grammar School material collected by a former pupil.
 The Old Retfordians Association still maintains contacts with those ex pupils who chose to do so.

References 

 
Defunct grammar schools in England
Educational institutions disestablished in 1979
Boys' schools in Nottinghamshire
Defunct schools in Nottinghamshire
Retford
1979 disestablishments in England
Educational institutions disestablished in 2003